Small Faces is a 1996 Scottish drama film directed by Gillies MacKinnon about gangs, specifically the Tongs, in 1960s Glasgow. It stars Iain Robertson, Joseph McFadden, Steven Duffy, Kevin McKidd, Laura Fraser, Mark McConnochie, Clare Higgins, Garry Sweeney, Colin McCredie and Alastair Galbraith.

Plot

Three teenage brothers – gang member Bobby, artistically-minded Alan and 13-year-old Lex – are growing up with their mother on Glasgow's South Side in 1968. Events which will have consequences for all concerned start to spiral out of control when Lex accidentally shoots Malky, the leader of the Garaside Tongs street gang, with an air gun.

Cast
Iain Robertson as Lex Maclean 
Joe McFadden as Alan Maclean (Credited as Joseph McFadden)
Steven Duffy as Bobby Maclean
Laura Fraser as Joanne Macgowan
Garry Sweeney as Charlie Sloan
Claire Higgins as Lorna Maclean
Kevin McKidd as Malky Johnson
Mark McConnochie as Gorbals
Steven Singleton as Welch
David Walker as Fabio
Ian McElhinney as Uncle Andrew
Paul Doonan as Jake
Colin Semple as Dowd
Colin McCredie as Doug
Debbie Welsh as Rebecca

Production
The film was produced in 1995 by Skyline Productions in association with the BBC Film Fund.

The film was shot on location at various districts in Glasgow, including Darnley, Sighthill, Partick, Merrylee, Mount Florida and Bishopbriggs and in Edinburgh. Scenes were also shot at the Glasgow School of Art. 

The song "In The Year 2525" by Zager and Evans is used as music over the closing credits.

Release
The film won 'Best British Film' at the Edinburgh Film Festival. It was released on 19 screens in the UK on 5 April 1996 and grossed £52,590 in its opening weekend. The film received a BBFC Certificate of 15 (intended for audiences aged 15 and over) within the United Kingdom. Some  argued that because of the high levels of violence and adult themes portrayed in this film, an 18 certificate would have been more suitable.

See also
Glasgow gangs
BFI Top 100 British films
List of hood films

References

External links
 
 

1996 films
Scottish films
Films set in Scotland
Films set in Glasgow
1996 drama films
Films shot in Glasgow
Films shot in Edinburgh
British drama films
Films directed by Gillies MacKinnon
1990s English-language films
1990s British films